Count Saint Germain (also sometimes referred to as Master Rákóczi or Master R) is a legendary spiritual master of the ancient wisdom in various Theosophical and post-Theosophical teachings, said to be responsible for the New Age culture of the Age of Aquarius and identified with the Count Saint Germain (fl. 1710–1784), who has been variously described as a courtier, adventurer, inventor, alchemist, pianist, violinist, and amateur composer.

Legend
Some write that his name St. Germain was invented by him as a French version of the Latin Sanctus Germanus, meaning "Holy Brother". In the Ascended Master Teachings (but not in traditional Theosophy), the Master R, or the Master Rákóczi, is a separate and distinct being from St. Germain.

Literature about St. Germain

Biographies
There are several "authoritative" biographers on St. Germain who usually do not agree with one another. Probably the two best-known biographies are Isabel Cooper-Oakley's The Count of St. Germain (1912), and Jean Overton-Fuller's The Comte de Saint-Germain: Last Scion of the House of Rakoczy (1988). The former is a compilation of letters, diaries, and private records written about the Count by members of the French aristocracy who knew him in the 18th century. 

Raymond Bernard's book The Great Secret – St. Germain is biographical and covers many aspects of the Count's life, including his conflation with Sir Francis Bacon, and the author of the Shakespearean opus. The Great Secret, Count St. Germain purports that St. Germain was actually Francis Bacon by birth, and later authored the complete Plays attributed to Shakespeare. Bernard also contends, as does the Saint Germain Foundation in Schaumburg, Illinois, that Francis Bacon was the child of Queen Elizabeth and Lord Dudley but that it was kept quiet. According to this theory, Francis was raised by the Bacon family, yet knew of his true birth, and left numerous hints throughout the Shakespearean canon of this, in the form of explicit clues in the text of the plays, in pictures, and in the alleged use of Bacon's cipher in the works. Manly Palmer Hall, in his The Secret Teachings of All Ages, describes some of the same attributes as Bernard, including the attribution of the writings of Shakespeare to a great adept like Francis Bacon, who could be amalgamated with the Count of St. Germain.

There have also been numerous French and German biographies, among them  by Peter Krassa, Le Comte de Saint-Germain by Marie-Raymonde Delorme, and L'énigmatique Comte De Saint-Germain by Pierre Ceria and François Ethuin.

Books claimed by Guy Ballard to have been dictated to him by Saint Germain
Saint Germain is the central figure in a series of books published by the Saint Germain Press (the publishing arm of the Saint Germain Foundation). The first two volumes, Unveiled Mysteries and The Magic Presence, written by Guy Ballard as "Godfré Ray King", describe Saint Germain as an Ascended master, like Jesus, who is assisting humanity. In these first two books, Ballard discusses his personal experiences with Saint Germain and reveals many teachings that are in harmony with Theosophy. The third volume, The 'I AM' Discourses, contains material that is foundational to the sacred scriptures of the "I AM" Religious Activity, founded in 1930 – the first of the Ascended Master Teachings religions.

There are 20 volumes in the Saint Germain Series of Books, which are also referred to as the "Green Books". Another significant work, the Comte de Gabalis, is said to be from the hand of Sir Francis Bacon before he Ascended and returned as Sanctus Germanus or Saint Germain. First printed in 1670, the book includes a picture of the Polish Rider, Rembrandt's famous painting at the Frick Collection in New York City, which is said to be of Sir Francis Bacon, AKA the Comte de Gabalis, or the Count of the Cabala. Lotus Ray King (Edna Ballard's pen name), wife of Guy Ballard, talked about this book having been authored by the Ascended Master Saint Germain in the Round Table Talks of the "I AM" Religious Activity.

Claimed encounters with Saint Germain
Several Theosophists and practitioners of alternate esoteric traditions have claimed to have met Saint Germain in the late 19th or early 20th centuries: 
 Annie Besant said that she met the Count in 1896.
 C. W. Leadbeater claimed to have met him in Rome in 1926 and gave a physical description of him as having brown eyes, olive colored skin, and a pointed beard; according to Leadbeater, "the splendour of his Presence impels men to make obeisance". Leadbeater said that Saint Germain showed him a robe that had been previously owned by a Roman Emperor and that Saint Germain told him that one of his residences was a castle in Transylvania. According to Leadbeater, when performing magical rituals in his castle in Transylvania, Saint Germain wears "a suit of golden chain-mail which once belonged to a Roman Emperor; over it is thrown a magnificent cloak of Tyrian purple, with on its clasp a seven-pointed star in diamond and amethyst, and sometimes he wears a glorious robe of violet."
David Christopher Lewis, living spiritual teacher, claims that Saint Germain first came to him in person on 10 June 2004 in his home in Paradise Valley, Montana, and continued to come many times thereafter.
 David Narozny, living Czech music composer, claims to have met St Germain in Pruhonice on 23 May 2014.
 Dorothy Leon, living author, has claimed to have had several encounters with Saint Germain and is an avowed disciple of his.
 Edgar Cayce, the "Sleeping Prophet", was asked while in trance if Saint Germain was present. Cayce's reply was: "When needed." (From reading # 254–83 on 14 February 1935.)
 Guy Ballard, founder of the "I AM" Activity, claimed that he met Saint Germain on Mount Shasta in California in August 1930, and that this initiated his "training" and experiences with other Ascended masters in various parts of the world.
 Miroslav Zimmer, living poet, claim to have met St Germain in the Malá Fatra mountains in Slovakia in 2011 in the company of a Sam Bennett.
 Peter Mt. Shasta, living spiritual teacher and author, claims that Saint Germain materialized before him in Muir Woods, Marin County, California, as well as many other times, some of which encounters he documents in his book.

Esoteric activities
Many groups honor Saint Germain as a supernatural being called a Master of the Ancient Wisdom or an Ascended master. In the Ascended Master Teachings he is referred to simply as Saint Germain, or as the Ascended Master Saint Germain. As an Ascended Master, Saint Germain is believed to have many magical powers such as the ability to teleport, levitate, walk through walls, and to inspire people by telepathy, among others.

The Theosophical Society after Blavatsky's death considered him to be a Mahatma, Master of the Ancient Wisdom, or Adept. Helena Blavatsky said that he was one of her Masters of Wisdom and hinted that he had given her secret documents. Some esoteric groups credit him with inspiring the Founding Fathers to draft the United States Declaration of Independence and the Constitution, as well as providing the design of the Great Seal of the United States.

In New Age beliefs, Saint Germain is associated with the color violet, the jewel amethyst, and the Maltese cross rendered in violet (usually the iron cross style cross patee version). He is also regarded as the "Chohan of the Seventh Ray". According to The Theosophical Society, the Seven Rays are seven metaphysical principles that govern both individual souls and the unfolding of each 2,158-year-long Astrological Age. Since according to Theosophy, the next Astrological Age, the Age of Aquarius, will be governed by the Seventh (Violet) Ray (the Ray of Ceremonial Order), Saint Germain is sometimes called "The Hierarch of the Age of Aquarius".  According to the Ascended Master Teachings, Saint Germain is "The God of Freedom for this system of worlds".  According to the Ascended Master Teachings, the preliminary lead-up to the beginning of the Age of Aquarius began on 1 July 1956, when Ascended Master Saint Germain became the Hierarch of the Age of Aquarius, replacing the former Astrological age Hierarch, the Ascended Master Jesus, who had been for almost 2,000 years the "Hierarch of the Age of Pisces".

In the works authored by Alice A. Bailey, Saint Germain is called Master Rakóczi or the Master R. In the Ascended Master Teachings, the Master Rakoczi, otherwise known as the Great Divine Director, is regarded as Saint Germain's teacher in the Great White Brotherhood of Ascended Masters. Alice A. Bailey's book The Externalisation of the Hierarchy (a compilation of earlier revelations published posthumously in 1957) gives the most information about his reputed role as a Spiritual Master. Saint Germain's spiritual title is said to be Lord of Civilization, and his task is the establishment of the new civilization of the Age of Aquarius. He is said to telepathically influence people who are seen by him as being instrumental in bringing about the new civilization of the Age of Aquarius. Alice A. Bailey stated that "sometime after AD 2025," the Jesus, the Master Rakóczi (Saint Germain), Kuthumi, and others in the Spiritual Hierarchy would "externalise", i.e., descend from the spiritual worlds, and interact in visible tangible bodies on the Earth in ashrams, surrounded by their disciples.

Alice A. Bailey said that St. Germain is the "manager of the executive council of the Christ".(Theosophists regard "the Master Jesus" and "Christ" as two separate and distinct beings.  They believe in the Gnostic Christology espoused by Cerinthus (fl. c. 100 AD), according to which "Christ" is a being who was incarnated in Jesus only during the three years of the ministry of Jesus.) According to certain Theosophists, "Christ" is identified as being a highly developed spiritual entity whose actual name is Maitreya. This Maitreya is the same being known in Buddhism as the Bodhisattva Maitreya, who is in training to become the next Buddha on Earth. According to Alice A. Bailey, the "executive council of the Christ" is a specific subgroup of the Masters of the Ancient Wisdom, charged with preparing the way for the Second Coming of Christ and the consequent inauguration of the Age of Aquarius.

Previous incarnations
According to The Theosophical Society (not to be confused with the United Lodge of Theosophists) and the Ascended Master Teachings, Saint Germain was incarnated as the following. (Note: Not all Theosophical and Ascended Master Teaching groups accept all of these incarnations as valid. St. Germain's incarnations as St. Alban, Proclus, Roger Bacon and Sir Francis Bacon are universally accepted.)

 Christopher Columbus, 1451–1506 AD. Believed to have been born in Genoa, Italy and settled in Portugal. Landed in America in 1492 during the first of four voyages to the New World sponsored by King Ferdinand and Queen Isabella of Spain
 Francis Bacon, 1561–1626, England. Philosopher, statesman, essayist and literary master, author of the Shakespearean plays (according to the Ascended Master Teachings), father of inductive science, and herald of the scientific revolution.
 Hesiod, Greek poet whose writings serve as a major source of insight into Greek mythology and cosmology (c. 700 BC).
 High priest in the civilization of Atlantis 13,000 years ago, serving in the Order of Lord Zadkiel in the Temple of Purification, located in an Atlantean colony that had been sent out from the main island of Atlantis that had been established on the island now called Cuba.
 Merlin. Mythical magician and counselor at King Arthur's Camelot who inspired the establishment of the Order of the Knights of the Round Table.
 Organizer behind the scenes for the Secret Societies in Germany in the late 14th and early 15th centuries. The creation of a possibly fictional character named "Christian Rosenkreuz" was inspired by his efforts.
 Plato, Philosopher who studied with students of Pythagoras and scholars in Egypt. He established his own school of philosophy at the Academy in Athens. (427–347 BC).
 Proclus, c. 410 – 485 AD. Athens. The last major Greek Neoplatonic philosopher. He headed the Platonic Academy and wrote extensively on philosophy, astronomy, mathematics, and grammar.
 Roger Bacon, c. 1220–1292 AD, England. Philosopher, educational reformer, and experimental scientist. Forerunner of modern science renowned for his exhaustive investigations into alchemy, optics, mathematics, and languages.
 Ruler of a Golden Age civilization centered in a city called "The City of the Sun" 70,000 years ago located in the then-lush and verdant area that is now the Sahara Desert, originally a colony sent out from Atlantis.
 Saint Alban, late 3rd or early 4th century, town of Verulamium, renamed St. Albans, Hertfordshire, England. First British martyr – he had sheltered a fugitive priest, became a devout convert, and was put to death for disguising himself as the priest so that he could die in his place.
 Saint Joseph, 1st century AD, Nazareth. Husband of Mary and guardian of Jesus.
 Samuel, 11th-century BC religious leader in Israel who served as prophet, priest, and last of the Hebrew judges.

Ascension into masterhood
According to the Ascended Master Teachings, Francis Bacon made it appear that he died on Easter Sunday, 9 April 1626, and even attended his own "funeral" in disguise.  It is believed by the adherents of the Ascended Master Teachings that he then traveled secretly to Transylvania (then part of Hungary, now part of Romania) to the Rakoczy Mansion of the noble family of Hungary. Finally on 1 May 1684 he is believed to have attained (by his knowledge of alchemy) his physical Ascension (attaining immortality and eternal youth – the sixth level of Initiation), at which time Francis Bacon adopted the name "Saint Germain".

Skeptical view
The scholar K. Paul Johnson maintains that the "Masters" that Madame Blavatsky wrote about and produced letters from were actually idealizations of people who were her mentors.

Also see the article "Talking to the Dead and Other Amusements" by Paul Zweig, The New York Times, 5 October 1980, which maintains that Madame Blavatsky's revelations were fraudulent.

See also
 Hodgson Report

Notes

Further reading

Encyclopedic reference
 Melton, J. Gordon Encyclopedia of American Religions 5th Edition New York:1996 Gale Research   Chapter 18--"The Ancient Wisdom Family of Religions" Pages 151–158; see chart on page 154 listing Masters of the Ancient Wisdom; Also see Section 18, Pages 717–757 Descriptions of various Ancient Wisdom religious organizations

Scholarly studies
 Campbell, Bruce F. A History of the Theosophical Movement Berkeley:1980 University of California Press
 Godwin, Joscelyn The Theosophical Enlightenment Albany, New York: 1994 State University of New York Press
 Johnson, K. Paul The Masters Revealed: Madam Blavatsky and Myth of the Great White Brotherhood Albany, New York: 1994 State University of New York Press

External links
  article on Saint Germain, also text "Adventures of a Western Mystic: Apprentice to the Masters, Book II, by Peter Mt. Shasta
 An Encyclopedia of Claims, Frauds, and Hoaxes of the Occult and Supernatural: Saint Germain  at the James Randi Educational Foundation
 Comte Saint-Germain:  The Immortal
 The Comte de St. Germain (1912) by Isabel Cooper-Oakley, at sacred-texts.com
 The Saint Germain Foundation, teaching arm of the "I AM" Activity, the original publisher of Ascended Master Teachings beginning in 1934

Ascended Master Teachings
Entering heaven alive
Folk saints
Masters of the Ancient Wisdom
Mythological characters
Supernatural beings identified with Christian saints